Route 180 is a highway in the St. Louis, Missouri area. Its western terminus is at Interstate 270 (I-270) in Bridgeton, running east into the western neighborhoods of St. Louis to its eastern terminus at Kingshighway Boulevard, the border of the St. Louis neighborhoods of Kingsway West and Kingsway East.

Route description
Route 180 is co-signed with Dr. Martin Luther King Drive, where the Drive (which originates farther east, where the Martin Luther King Bridge crosses the Mississippi River into central St. Louis) continues through to join Route 180's eastern terminus at Kingshighway Boulevard, in St. Louis. Route 180 is co-signed with Dr. Martin Luther King Drive, as both travel east, until it crosses the border between the cities of Wellston (to the east) and Pagedale, at a T intersection with Lucas-Hunt Road, where Route 180 becomes co-signed with St. Charles Rock Road through Pagedale and continuing west.

History

Major intersections

Auxiliary route

Route 180 Spur, also known as Pennsylvania Avenue, starts at an intersection with Route 180 and proceeds south to terminate at Route D (Page Avenue) in Pagedale.

References

180
Streets in St. Louis
Transportation in St. Louis County, Missouri